Dongducheon is a city in Gyeonggi Province, South Korea.

The city, to the north of Seoul, is strategically important for the defense of the Korean capital. The main camps of the United States Second Infantry Division are in the city, and the division command is at Uijeongbu.

History
Under Goguryeo, the dynasty's territory extended southward into Korean peninsula, and Dongducheon became part of the kingdom in the form of naeulmae hyun (a certain form of ancient village land holding). Later Dongducheon became Sacheon village of Unified Silla in the North-South States Period. It was part of the district of Yangju in Goryeo.

Modern
In 1963, its status was raised to that of a township, Tongduchon (eup). In 1981, Dongducheon City was established, encompassing Yangju county.

Statistics

Climate
Dongducheon has a monsoon-influenced humid continental climate (Köppen: Dwa) with cold, dry winters and hot, rainy summers.

Festivals
Since 1999, Dongducheon has annually hosted the Dongducheon Rock Festival, one of the biggest rock festivals in South Korea. In 2007, the festival was held at Camp Nimble, a former US Army installation returned to South Korea.

A maple festival is held every autumn in several streets and parts of the city.

Education
There are 10 high schools, 15 middle schools, 38 elementary schools, and Hanbuk University.

U.S. Military Bases 
Camp Casey
Camp Castle
Camp Hovey
Camp Nimble

Notable people from Dongducheon
 Jang Dong-shin (Hangul: 장동신), South Korean ice sledge hockey player and wheelchair fencer.
 Oh Young-hwan (Hangul: 오영환), South Korean firefighter, essayist and politician.
 Kim Dong-jin (Hangul: 김동진), former South Korean footballer.
 Hwang Ji-soo (Hangul: 황지수), former South Korean footballer.
 Kim Do-heon (Hangul: 김도헌), South Korean professional footballer.
 Na-mi (Real Name: Gim Myeong-ok, Hangul: 김명옥), South Korean singer.
 Yang Se-hyung (Hangul: 양세형), South Korean actor, comedian, MC and older brother of Yang Se-chan.
 Yang Se-chan (Hangul: 양세찬), South Korean actor, comedian, singer and younger brother of Yang Se-hyung.
 J-NO (Real Name: Yoon Dae Hyuk, Hangul: 윤대혁), singer, dancer and K-pop idol,  member of K-pop boygroup APL.
 Yeeun (Real Name: Jang Ye-eun, Hangul: 장예은), singer, rapper, dancer, model, MC and K-pop idol,  member of K-pop girlgroup CLC.
 Bit-to (Real Name: Lee Chang-hyun, Hangul: 이창현), singer, rapper, dancer and K-pop idol,  member of K-pop boygroup UP10TION

See also
 List of cities in South Korea

References

External links

Official city website 

 
Cities in Gyeonggi Province